The 1985 Boston Marathon was the 89th running of the annual marathon race in Boston, United States, which was held on April 15. The elite men's race was won by Great Britain's Geoff Smith in a time of 2:14:05 hours and the women's race was won by American Lisa Rainsberger in 2:34:06. In the wheelchair race, George Murray of the United States won the men's race in 1:45:34 and Candace Cable of United States won the women's race in 2:05:26.

A total of 3931 runners finished the race, 3472 men and 459 women.

The elite field was of a lower standard than usual, given the lack of prize money on offer and it being the year after an Olympics. The men's and women's winners were by far the favourites for their races, Smith particularly so after the refusal to admit Mark Plaatjes into the race, as part of the international sporting boycott of South Africa during the apartheid era.

Results

Men

Women

Wheelchair men

Wheelchair women

References

Results. Association of Road Racing Statisticians. Retrieved 2020-07-26.
Boston Marathon Historical Results. Boston Athletic Association. Retrieved 2020-07-26.
1985 Boston Marathon Marathon Wheelchair. Athlinks. Retrieved 2020-07-26.

External links
 Boston Athletic Association website

Boston Marathon
Boston
Boston Marathon
Marathon
Boston Marathon